The  2007 AFF Women's Championship was hosted by Myanmar and was held from 6–15 September. The host defeated Thailand in the final to win their second title.

Group stage

Group A

Group B

Knockout stage

Semi-finals

Third place match

Final

Awards
.

Final ranking

External links
2007 AFF Women's Championship at AFF official website

Women's
AFF Women's
2007
International association football competitions hosted by Myanmar